"Snowman" is a song by Australian singer-songwriter Sia. It was released on 9 November 2017, as the second single from Sia's eighth studio album, Everyday Is Christmas. A music video made via claymation was released on 30 October 2020. A part two of the music video was released on 22 December 2022.

"Snowman" earned positive reviews from critics, some of whom deemed it the highlight single from Everyday Is Christmas. The song experienced a popularity surge in November 2020 on TikTok, and has since been branded as a modern-day Christmas classic.

In 2020, Brandon Funston of The Athletic listed "Snowman" as the 85th best Christmas song of all-time.

Composition 

"Snowman" was written by Sia and frequent collaborator Greg Kurstin. Written in the key of D♭ major, Sia's vocals span from F3 to G♭5. Production on the track was handled solely by Kurstin. The song is a midtempo, 60's-inspired, piano-driven, crisp, swaying ballad over which Sia's vocals, described as "calm but energetic" by mxdwn, tell a snowman not to cry as he will melt. The track runs for a length of 2 minutes and 45 seconds.

Release and promotion 
"Snowman" was announced on Sia's social media accounts on 7 November 2017, and was released for digital download and streaming on 9 November 2017 as the second single from Everyday Is Christmas. Sia performed "Snowman" on The Ellen DeGeneres Show, and on the finale of the fifteenth season of American reality TV series The Voice.

In December 2020, a challenge based around the song on video-sharing app TikTok saw a massive rise in popularity, becoming a trend. The challenge sees TikTok users attempt to sing a portion of the song, lasting forty seconds, in one breath. Sia subsequently released a "Snowed In & Slowed Down Remix" of the track, which was later featured on the Snowman Deluxe Edition of Everyday is Christmas on 5 November 2021. In addition to this, a sped-up version was included on the 2022 reissue of the album.

Reception 
Slant Magazine described the song as a "clever ode to fleeting romance". Slate named it the best song on Everyday Is Christmas, noting it "[takes] something we associate with winter and [applies] it to a universal theme." In 2020, Brandon Funston of The Athletic listed "Snowman" as the 85th best Christmas song of all-time. Billboard, in 2022, described the song as a "modern seasonal classic".

NME commented that the TikTok remix version of the song "opts for a breezier tempo than the original, with Sia changing the song’s key midway through for extra effect."

Commercial performance 
Upon its initial release in 2017, "Snowman" debuted and peaked at number 3 on the Billboard Holiday Digital Songs Sales chart dated 2 December 2017. Following its rise in popularity in 2020, the track reached the top 50 in Australia, Canada, France and Germany, among others, and peaked at number 25 on the Billboard Global 200. In 2021, it reached number 1 on the Finnish Singles Chart, becoming Sia's first chart-topping hit in the country. In the same year, it topped the Norwegian Singles Chart for two weeks and returned to number 1 for four additional weeks in 2022.

As of December 2022, "Snowman" was one of the 10 most-streamed Christmas songs of all-time on streaming platform Spotify.

Music videos 
On 30 October 2020, a claymation music video for "Snowman", directed by Lior Molcho, premiered on YouTube. On 22 December 2022, a "Part II" of the video was released, also directed by Molcho.

Credits and personnel 
Credits adapted from Tidal.

 Sia Furler – songwriter, vocals
 Greg Kurstin – songwriter, producer, bass, drums, keyboards, piano, engineer
 Alex Pasco – engineer
 Julian Burg – engineer
 Şerban Ghenea – mixer
 John Hanes – mixing engineer
 Chris Gehringer – mastering engineer

Charts

Weekly charts

Year-end charts

Certifications

Release history

References 

2010s ballads
2017 songs
2017 singles
Number-one singles in Finland
Number-one singles in Norway
Sia (musician) songs
Song recordings produced by Greg Kurstin
Songs written by Greg Kurstin
Songs written by Sia (musician)
Stop-motion animated music videos